Touchin' on Trane is a live album by American jazz saxophonist Charles Gayle, bassist William Parker, and percussionist Rashied Ali, featuring performances inspired by John Coltrane which were recorded in Germany in 1993 for the FMP label.

Reception

The Allmusic review by Brian Flota awarded the album five stars out of five, stating "This is Charles Gayle's most accessible work. Gayle's mastery of free jazz is blended with a more traditional compositional style of jazz on this disc... Gayle, bassist William Parker, and Ali don't copy Coltrane, but rather expand on his accomplishments. Without covering any songs, Touchin' on Trane is the greatest John Coltrane tribute album".

The Penguin Guide to Jazz identified the album as part of their suggested "Core Collection" of essential jazz albums and awarded the compilation a "Crown", signifying a recording that the authors "feel a special admiration or affection for".

Track listing
All compositions by Charles Gayle. William Parker & Rashied Ali''
 "Part A" – 14:41  
 "Part B" – 7:05  
 "Part C" – 12:28  
 "Part D" – 27:42  
 "Part E" – 4:48

Personnel
Charles Gayle – tenor saxophone
William Parker – bass
Rashied Ali – drums

References 

1993 live albums
Charles Gayle live albums
FMP Records live albums